"First Days" is a song by British singer Deno, released as a tribute to Cadet after he died in a road collision in February 2019. The song was distributed via Columbia Records, however Underrated Records held the rights for the song. It was released on 13 February 2019 and peaked at number 71 on the UK Singles Chart. Deno stated that this song is independent and that all money made from it would be going to the family of Cadet.

Track listing

Charts

References

2019 songs
2019 singles
Deno (singer) songs
Columbia Records singles